Lakhpur Union is a Union Parishad under Fakirhat Upazila of Bagerhat District in the division of Khulna, Bangladesh. It has an area of 47.99 km2 (18.53 sq mi) and a population of 16,747.

Villages 
 Lakhpur
 Boro Khajura
 Choto Khajura
 Kahardanga
 Mightkomra

References

Unions of Fakirhat Upazila
Unions of Bagerhat District
Unions of Khulna Division